Altamura was a railway station in Altamura, Italy. The station was located on the Rocchetta Sant'Antonio-Gioia del Colle railway and the train services were operated by Trenitalia. It was shut down in 2016.

Train services
The station was served by the following service(s):

Local services (Treno regionale) Gravina in Puglia - Altamura - Gioia del Colle - Taranto

Bus services
Rocchetta Sant'Antonio - Spinazzola - Gravina in Puglia - Altamura - Gioia del Colle

References

 This article is based upon a translation of the Italian language version as of September 2014.

Railway stations in Apulia
Buildings and structures in the Province of Bari
Altamura